Elizabeth Whitney Williams was an American lighthouse keeper and writer. She served as a lighthouse keeper for 41 years, including a 29-year stint at the Little Traverse Light.

Early life 
Williams (née Whitney) was born on Mackinac Island, Michigan, on June 24, 1844. By the time she was four years old, her family had moved to Beaver Island where her father, a carpenter, worked for the Mormon leader "King" James Strang. In 1852, after being pressured to convert, the Whitney family fled to Charlevoix and then to Traverse City. After Strang was assassinated and the Mormons were forced out, the Whitney family returned to Beaver Island in 1857 where Williams met and married Clement Van Riper, a cooper from Detroit, in 1860. Van Riper began teaching in the nearby Anishinaabe community on Garden Island, where Williams assisted her husband and taught gardening techniques.

Career 
In 1869, Van Riper was appointed keeper of the Beaver Island Harbor Light after the prior keeper, Peter McKinley, resigned due to poor health. However, Van Riper was also often in poor health and Williams assisted her husband by cleaning and polishing the Fresnel lens.

During a stormy night in 1872, Van Riper rowed out to help rescue a sinking ship but never returned. The duty fell on Williams to keep the light burning in the lighthouse during the three-day storm and she was left "weak from sorrow." A few weeks after her husband's death she was officially appointed keeper of the Beaver Island Harbor Light during a time when few women were ever appointed and lighthouse keeping was thought of as a man's job due to the physical labor and investment of time. She found the responsibility daunting but "longed to do something for humanity's sake" and seemed to view tending the light as both a calling and comfort.

In 1875, Williams remarried—to photographer Daniel Williams—and eventually requested a transfer to a lighthouse on the mainland. In September 1884, she was transferred to the newly constructed Little Traverse Light at Harbor Springs. Williams excelled at her work and later won an award for best-kept light on the Great Lakes. By 1897, she was one of only four female lighthouse keepers on the Great Lakes, down from about 30 in 1851, due to the position becoming a political appointment and thus a way to repay campaign favors. In 1905, Williams published an autobiography entitled A Child of the Sea and My Life Among Mormons.

Later life 
Williams retired in 1913 and moved to Charlevoix with her husband where they spent 25 years in quiet retirement. Williams died, 12 hours after her husband, on January 23, 1938.

Legacy 
Williams is one of America's longest-serving lighthouse keepers with 41 years of service. Her autobiography continues to provide insight into women's experiences in the Great Lakes region and remains in print. A children's book, Elizabeth Whitney Williams and The Little Traverse Light, is based upon Williams' life.

References

Further reading
 

1844 births
1938 deaths
United States Lighthouse Service personnel
Women lighthouse keepers
People from Mackinac Island, Michigan